Le Vivier is a commune in the Pyrénées-Orientales department in southern France.

Geography 
Le Vivier is located in the canton of La Vallée de l'Agly and in the arrondissement of Prades.

Population

See also
Communes of the Pyrénées-Orientales department

References

Communes of Pyrénées-Orientales
Fenouillèdes